Char Lakshmi is an island of Barisal Division of Bangladesh.

References

Islands of Bangladesh
Uninhabited islands of Bangladesh